Papaveroideae is a subfamily of the family Papaveraceae (the poppy family).

Genera 
 Subfamily Papaveroideae Eaton
 Tribe Eschscholzieae Baill.
 Dendromecon Benth. – California.
 Eschscholzia Cham. – Western North America.
 Hunnemannia Sweet – Eastern Mexico.
 Tribe Chelidonieae Dumort.
 Bocconia L. – Central and southern America, Antilles
 Chelidonium L. – Eurasia
 Dicranostigma Hook.f. & Thomson – Central Asia
 Eomecon Hance – Eastern China
 Glaucium Mill. – Europe to Central Asia
 Hylomecon Maxim. –  Eastern Asia
 Macleaya R.Br. – Eastern Asia
 Sanguinaria L. – Eastern North America
 Stylophorum Nutt. – Eastern North America, Eastern Asia
 Tribe Platystemoneae Spach
 Hesperomecon Greene –  Western North America
 Meconella Nutt. – Western North America
 Platystemon Benth. – Western North America
 Tribe Papavereae Dumort.
 Arctomecon Torr. & Frém. – Western North America
 Argemone L. – North America, Antilles, central and southern America, Hawaii
 Canbya Parry – Western North America
 Meconopsis Vig. – Central southern Asia, western Europe; paraphyletic
 Papaver L. – Northern hemisphere, South Africa, Cape Verde; paraphyletic
 Roemeria Medik. –  Mediterranean region, south west Asia
 Romneya Harv. – California
 Stylomecon G. Taylor – California

References

External links

 
Eudicot subfamilies